The 1950 Kent State Golden Flashes football team was an American football team that represented Kent State University in the Ohio Athletic Conference (OAC) during the 1950 college football season. In its fifth season under head coach Trevor J. Rees, Kent State compiled a 5–4 record.

Schedule

References

Kent State
Kent State Golden Flashes football seasons
Kent State Golden Flashes football